Souleymane Sawadogo (born 1 November 1995) is a Burkinabé professional football player, who plays for French Championnat National 2 clubUS Granville.

Club career
Sawadogo made his Ligue 2 debut with AJ Auxerre at 9 August 2013 against Nîmes Olympique. In 2014, he joined Clermont Foot. On 22 December he signed a -year contract with Greek Superleague club Levadiakos for an undisclosed fee. It was his first time in his career that will play in the highest level. On 14 April 2018, he scored with an astonishing effort helping his club to win 1-0 rivals Asteras Tripoli. It was his first goal with the club.

Sawadogo returned to France with Gazélec Ajaccio in January 2020, and then moved to US Créteil-Lusitanos in June 2020. He was released at the end of the season, and spent six months without a club, before signing for US Granville in early February 2022.

International career
Sawadogo made his debut for the Burkina Faso national football team in a 1-0 friendly win over Cameroon national football team on 27 May 2018.

Career statistics

References

1995 births
Living people
Burkinabé footballers
Burkinabé expatriate footballers
Burkina Faso international footballers
AJ Auxerre players
Clermont Foot players
LB Châteauroux players
Levadiakos F.C. players
Gazélec Ajaccio players
US Créteil-Lusitanos players
US Granville players
Ligue 2 players
Championnat National players
Championnat National 2 players
Championnat National 3 players
Super League Greece players
Sportspeople from Ouagadougou
Association football defenders
Burkinabé expatriate sportspeople in France
Burkinabé expatriate sportspeople in Greece
Expatriate footballers in France
Expatriate footballers in Greece
21st-century Burkinabé people